Capsule may refer to:

Anatomy
 Articular capsule (joint capsule), an envelope surrounding a synovial joint
 Bowman's capsule (glomerular capsule), a sac surrounding a glomerulus in a mammalian kidney
 Glisson's capsule, a fibrous layer covering the external surface of the liver
 Renal capsule, a tough fibrous layer surrounding the kidney

Capsules of the brain
 External capsule
 Extreme capsule
 Internal capsule

Medicine
 Bacterial capsule, a layer that lies outside the cell wall of bacteria
 Yeast capsule, a layer surrounding some pathogenic yeasts
 Capsular contracture, the scar tissue naturally forming around breast implants
 Capsule (pharmacy), a small gelatinous case enclosing a dose of medication
 Lymph node capsule

Other uses
 Capsule (CRM), a Customer Relationship Management SaaS web application and mobile app
 Capsule (2016 film), a 2016 British science fiction film with a Project Mercury era fictional astronaut
 Capsule (band), a Japanese electronic duo
 Capsule (Ferris wheel), a passenger compartment
 Capsule (fruit), or seed capsule, a type of dry fruit like the poppy, iris or foxglove
 Capsule (geometry), a shape consisting of a cylinder capped with hemispheres
 Capsule hotel, a type of very dense overnight lodging popular in urban Japan
 Capsule (microphone), the component which converts acoustic energy into an electric signal
 Capsule (website), an event-sharing social platform
 The Capsule, a 2012 Greek short film
 Capsule neural network, a type of artificial neural network
 Capsule review, short critique
 Space capsule, a type of crewed spacecraft
 Time capsule, a cache of items and/or information to be preserved for future times

See also 
 Encapsulation (disambiguation)